Eggerding is a municipality in the district of Schärding in the Austrian state of Upper Austria.

Geography
Eggerding lies in the Innviertel. About 10 percent of the municipality is forest, and 79 percent is farmland.

References

Cities and towns in Schärding District